Locust Hill is a historic home and farm complex located at Locust Dale, Madison County, Virginia. The two-story frame house incorporates an original side-passage- plan section dating to 1834. which was enlarged and given a two-tier Doric order front porch probably about 1849. About 1900 a three-story bathroom tower, a summer kitchen, and a brick greenhouse wing were added. The house includes Federal and Greek Revival style elements.  Also on the property are the contributing Willis's School (1897), smokehouse, cistern, dairy, brick lined pit, the site of a water tower, chicken house, Locust Dale store and Post Office (1880s), and Fertilizer House (1934).

It was listed on the National Register of Historic Places in 2002.

References

Houses on the National Register of Historic Places in Virginia
Farms on the National Register of Historic Places in Virginia
Federal architecture in Virginia
Greek Revival houses in Virginia
Houses completed in 1834
Houses in Madison County, Virginia
National Register of Historic Places in Madison County, Virginia
1834 establishments in Virginia